Shirley Thomas may refer to:

Shirley Thomas (USC professor) (1920–2005), an American radio/television actress/writer/producer, advocate for United States Space Program & professor of technical writing
Shirley Thomas (athlete) (born 1963), a British women's track runner
Shirley Thomas (equestrian), see Sport in Ottawa

See also
Thomas Shirley (disambiguation)